Saint Marinus was an Early Christian and the founder of a chapel and monastery in 301 from whose initial community the state of San Marino later grew.

Life
Tradition holds that he was a stonemason by trade who came from the island of Arba (today Rab), on the other side of the Adriatic Sea (in what is now part of modern-day Croatia, then part of the Roman Empire), fleeing persecution for his Christian beliefs in the Diocletianic Persecution. 

Known only by the single name Marinus (lit. of the sea), he became a Deacon, and was ordained by Gaudentius, the Bishop of Rimini; later, he was recognised and accused by an insane woman of being her estranged husband, so he quickly fled to Monte Titano to build a chapel-monastery and live as a hermit. 

Another version of the story says that hearing that the town of Rimini (Italy) was being rebuilt, he travelled there and was astonished to find among the workmen many Christians of high birth who had been sentenced to hard labour because of their refusal to sacrifice to the gods. He sought to comfort them and to alleviate their sufferings, so far as was in his power.  In his old age Marinus withdrew to a hermitage and decided to seclude himself on Mount Titano, living the life of a hermit in holy contemplation. As his reputation for his sanctity grew, others started to follow him there, until finally a lady from Rimini and the owner of Mount Titano decided to gift him the mountain.

Marinus was canonised as a saint, and later, the State of San Marino grew up from the centre created by the monastery. His feast day/memorial day is 3 September, commemorating the day, in 301, when he founded what became known as San Marino, which is also the state's national holiday. He is venerated in the Roman Catholic and Eastern Orthodox faiths.

According to legend, he died in the winter of 366 and his last words were: "" ("I leave you free from both men"). This somewhat mysterious phrase is most likely to refer to the two "men" from whose oppressive power Saint Marinus had decided to separate himself, becoming a hermit on Mount Titano: respectively the Emperor and the Pope. This affirmation of freedom (first and foremost fiscal franchise) from both the Empire and the Papal States, however legendary, has always been the inspiration of the tiny republic.

Sources

The earliest manuscripts mentioning Saint Marinus and his life date to the 10th century. Another principal source of the events of Marinus's life were compiled in the Acta Sanctorum.

See also
History of San Marino

References

External links
Patron Saints Index: Saint Marinus
 

Sammarinese Roman Catholic saints
3rd-century births
366 deaths
History of San Marino
People from the City of San Marino
4th-century Romans
4th-century Christian saints
Republicans
People from Rab
Legendary Romans
Hermits in the Roman Empire
Diocletianic Persecution